The 1984 AFC Asian Cup Final was a football match which determined the winner of the 1984 AFC Asian Cup, the 8th edition of the AFC Asian Cup, a quadrennial tournament contested by the men's national teams of the member associations of the Asian Football Confederation. The match was won by Saudi Arabia, defeating China 2–0.

Venue

The Former Singapore National Stadium was located in Kallang, Singapore, hosted the 1984 AFC Asian Cup final. The 55,000 Capacity Stadium opened in 1973 and closed in 2007. The stadium was demolished from 2010 to 2011 and replaced by Singapore National Stadium. It was only stadium used to host the 1984 Asian Cup; all matches were played in this stadium.

Route to the final

Match

Details

References

External links 
 

Final
China national football team matches
Saudi Arabia national football team matches
1984 in Singapore
1984
December 1984 sports events in Asia
Sports competitions in Singapore